Ioana Flora (born 22 March 1975) is a Romanian actress. She appeared in more than twenty films since 2001.

Selected filmography

References

External links 

1975 births
Living people
Romanian film actresses
Romanian people of Serbian descent
Serbian people of Romanian descent